Krasnoselsky District is a district of the federal city of St. Petersburg, Russia. As of the 2010 Census, its population: was 330,546; up from 305,129 recorded in the 2002 Census.

History
The district was established on April 13, 1973.

Municipal divisions
Krasnoselsky District comprises the municipal town of Krasnoye Selo and the following six municipal okrugs:
Gorelovo
Konstantinovskoye
Sosnovaya Polyana
Uritsk
Yugo-Zapad
Yuzhno-Primorsky

References

Notes

Sources

 
States and territories established in 1973